Kweon Kab-yong (3 October 1957 – 23 January 2023) was a South Korean 9 dan professional Go player. Kweon turned professional in 1975. He started a Go school in Korea in 1989 that is often compared to Kitani Minoru's school. As of 2003, his school had produced over 100 total dans.

Pupils
Lee Sedol 9 dan – winner of 18 international titles.
Choi Cheol-han 9 dan – ranks 10th for most titles in Korean go history.
Won Seong-jin 9 dan – winner of the GS Caltex Cup in 2010.
Chen Shiyuan 9 dan – top Taiwanese player and winner of the 4th Japan-Taiwan Jingying.
Park Junghwan 9 dan – youngest Korean 9 dan.
Lee Younggu 8 dan – runner-up of the Prices Information Cup in 2007.
Yun Junsang 8 dan – won the national champion, Guksu, in 2006.
Kim Jiseok 7 dan – won most games (71) and the Prices Information Cup in 2009.

See also 

 Go professional

References

External links 
 Korea Baduk Association profile (in Korean)

1957 births
2023 deaths
South Korean Go players